Robertas Urbonas (born 11 May 1960 in Klaipeda) is a Lithuanian film producer.

Filmography
 Guinevere, (1994)
 Under the Milky Way, (1995)
 Undertow, (1996)
 The New Adventures of Robin Hood, (1997)
 Vilko dantu karoliai, (1997)
 Die kaukasische Nacht, (1998)
 The Devil's Arithmetic, (1999)
 Elze's Life, (2000)
 Perilous, (2000)
 Attila, (2001)
 Der Mann, den sie nicht lieben durfte, (2001)
 Invincible, (2001)
 The Hit, (2001)
 Warrior Angels, (2002)
 Endangered Species, (2002)
 The Red Phone: Manhunt, (2002)
 Benjamin Franklin, (2002)
 Out of the Ashes, (2003)
 Special Forces, (2003)
 Dr. Jekyll and Mr. Hyde, (2003)
 Insatiability, (2003)
 P.O.W., (2003)
 Colette, une femme libre, (2004)
 Ratten 2 - Sie kommen wieder!, (2004)
 Uncle Adolf, (2005)
 Nature Unleashed: Earthquake, (2005)
 Wellen, (2005)
 Russian Dolls: Sex Trade, (2005)
 Forest of the Gods, (2005)
 Silence Becomes You, (2005)
 Störtebeker, (2006)
 Snapphanar, (2006)
 Dieviskoji sviesa, (2006)
 Iskyss, (2008)
 Muzh moey vdovy, (2010)
 1939 Battle of Westerplatte, (2013)

References

External links
 

Lithuanian film producers
1960 births
Living people